Typhlochactas mitchelli is a species of scorpion of the family Typhlochactidae. It is endemic to the state of Oaxaca, Mexico. This species is of the eyeless cave-dwelling genus Typhlochactas.

References

External links
 "Phylogenetic Analysis of Mexican Cave Scorpions Suggests Adaptation to Caves Is Reversible" from Science Daily website

Typhlochactidae
Cave arachnids
Animals described in 1988
Endemic scorpions of Mexico
Fauna of the Sierra Madre de Oaxaca